Wholly Communion is a short documentary film made in 1965 by British filmmaker Peter Whitehead. It was filmed at the Royal Albert Hall, London, and documents a poetry event held on 11 June 1965 called the International Poetry Incarnation. It features poetry readings by Beat poets from the UK and U.S., including Allen Ginsberg, Michael Horovitz, Adrian Mitchell and Austrian poet Ernst Jandl.

References

External links 
 

1965 films
Films about the Beat Generation
Documentary films about poets
British short documentary films
Films shot in London
1965 documentary films
1960s short documentary films
1960s English-language films
1960s British films